|}

The Mooresbridge Stakes is a Group 2 flat horse race in Ireland open to thoroughbreds aged four years or older. It is run over a distance of 1 mile and 2 furlongs (2,012 metres) at the Curragh in early May.

History
The event is named after Mooresbridge (or "Moore's Bridge"), a bridge close to the racecourse on the Curragh plain.

For a period the race held Listed status. It was promoted to Group 3 level in 2003 and upgraded to Group 2 status in 2017.

The Mooresbridge Stakes is currently sponsored by Coolmore Stud. Its sponsored title includes the name of Sottsass, a Coolmore stallion.

Records

Most successful horse since 1986 (2 wins):
 Nysaean – 2003, 2004

Leading jockey since 1986 (5 wins):
 Michael Kinane – Executive Perk (1989), Definite Article (1996), Urban Ocean (2000), Nysaean (2004), Alayan (2006)
 Pat Smullen - Stage Affair (1998), Muakaad (2001), Cairdeas (2005), Regime (2008), Fascinating Rock (2015)
 Ryan Moore - Found (2016), Minding (2017), Cliffs of Moher (2018), Magical (2019), Broome (2021) 

Leading trainer since 1986 (13 wins):
 Aidan O'Brien – Dancing Sunset (1995), Urban Ocean (2000), Septimus (2007), Fame and Glory (2010), So You Think (2011), Windsor Palace (2012), Camelot (2013), Magician (2014), Found (2016), Minding (2017), Cliffs of Moher (2018), Magical (2019), Broome (2021)

Winners since 1986

See also
 Horse racing in Ireland
 List of Irish flat horse races

References

 Paris-Turf:
 Racing Post:

 galopp-sieger.de – Mooresbridge Stakes.
 ifhaonline.org – International Federation of Horseracing Authorities – Mooresbridge Stakes (2019).
 pedigreequery.com – Mooresbridge Stakes – Curragh.

Open middle distance horse races
Curragh Racecourse
Flat races in Ireland